Lambert is a pianist and composer from Hamburg, Germany.
He always performs wearing a Sardinian mask.
He composed the music for the 2015 film Hedi Schneider Is Stuck.

Discography

Albums  
 2014 – Lambert (Staatsakt)
 2015 – Stay in the Dark (Staatsakt)
 2016 – Excess / The Improv Tape (Dauw)
 2017 – Sweet Apocalypse (Mercury KX/Decca/Universal Classics)
 2018 - We Share Phenomena (collaboration with Brookln Dekker)
 2019 - True (Mercury KX/Decca/Universal Classics)
 2020 - False (Mercury KX/Decca/Universal Classics)
 2022 - Open (Mercury KX/Decca/Universal Classics)

EPs  
 2016 – Lost Tapes (Staatsakt)
 2018 – Exodus (collaboration with Stimming) (Kryptox)
 2019 – Alone (Mercury KX/Decca/Universal Classics)

Soundtracks 
 2015 – Hedi Schneider is Stuck
 2020 – Inez & Doug & Kira (Mercury KX/Decca/Universal Classics)

References

External links

 Official website
 
 

1983 births
21st-century German male classical pianists
Contemporary classical music performers
German classical pianists
German contemporary classical composers
German film score composers
Living people
Male film score composers
Masked musicians
Mercury KX artists